The White Dove may refer to:
The White Dove (Danish fairy tale)
The White Dove (French fairy tale)
The White Dove (1920 film), a 1920 American film directed by Henry King
The White Dove (1942 film), a 1942 Spanish film directed by Claudio de la Torre
"The White Dove", a song written by Carter Stanley and recorded in 1949 by the bluegrass group The Stanley Brothers, later also by e.g. The Seldom Scene.
The White Dove (1960 film), a 1960 Czechoslovak film directed by František Vláčil
The White Dove School, a Nigerian based school that uses both a British and Nigerian curriculum located in LagosState, Nigeria

See also 
 White dove (disambiguation)